Founded in 1938, Snell & Wilmer is a full-service business law firm with more than 450 attorneys practicing
in 15 locations throughout the United States and in Mexico, including Los Angeles, Orange County and San
Diego, California; Phoenix and Tucson, Arizona; Denver, Colorado; Washington, D.C.; Boise, Idaho; Las
Vegas and Reno, Nevada; Albuquerque,  New Mexico; Portland, Oregon; Salt Lake City, Utah; Seattle,
Washington; and Los Cabos, Mexico. The firm represents clients ranging from large, publicly traded
corporations to small businesses, individuals and entrepreneurs.

Snell & Wilmer is the largest law firm in Arizona and the western region. Matthew P. Feeney is the chairman.

References

Law firms established in 1938
Law firms based in Phoenix, Arizona
1938 establishments in Arizona